Sidney Schmeltz (born 8 June 1989) is a Dutch footballer who currently plays for Al-Ahli Manama. He is a convert to Islam.

Schmeltz started his career with SV Geinoord in Nieuwegein, but was scouted by RKC Waalwijk on early age. August 2008 he switched to Willem II Tilburg. Despite he was not allowed to play yet, he made his debut for the Willem II reserve squad in a cup-match against RKC Waalwijk. Therefore, the Royal Dutch Football Association (KNVB) decided to play a rematch.

On 19 April 2009 Schmeltz made his first appearance in the Willem II First Squad in the home-match against ADO Den Haag (3–3), as a substitute for Sergio Zijler. Schmeltz appeared in the starting line-up for the first time two weeks later against Roda JC (0–1 win).

In August 2010, Schmeltz was signed by Almere City in a one-year deal. He left City after one season to play for Sparta Rotterdam, but was released despite an ongoing contract in the summer after it. He signed with SC Veendam, but became a free agent after the club's bankruptcy in March 2013.

In June 2013, Schmeltz signed a three-year deal with League One side Oldham Athletic.

On 10 January 2014, Schmeltz joined Shrewsbury Town on loan until the end of the season, making his debut the following day against Milton Keynes Dons. Schmeltz had his contract terminated with immediate effect in February 2014.

Schmeltz joined Hartlepool United on 31 October 2014 on a short-term deal and was released at the end of the year.

References

External links

1989 births
Living people
Dutch footballers
Dutch sportspeople of Surinamese descent
Eredivisie players
Eerste Divisie players
Willem II (football club) players
Almere City FC players
Sparta Rotterdam players
SC Veendam players
Oldham Athletic A.F.C. players
Hartlepool United F.C. players
People from Nieuwegein
English Football League players
Association football wingers
Footballers from Utrecht (province)
Expatriate footballers in Egypt
Expatriate footballers in Bahrain
Expatriate footballers in England
Petrojet SC players
Al-Ahli Club (Manama) players
Dutch expatriate footballers
Dutch expatriate sportspeople in Bahrain
Dutch expatriate sportspeople in Egypt
Dutch expatriate sportspeople in England